Relations between the European Union and the Palestine Liberation Organisation (PLO) were established in 1975 as part of the Euro-Arab Dialogue. The EU is a member of the Quartet and is the single largest donor of foreign aid to the Palestinian Authority.

Nine out of twenty-seven EU member states recognize Palestine. In 2014, Sweden became the first country to recognise Palestine while being an EU member state. Malta and Cyprus had recognized Palestine prior to joining the EU, as did a number of Central European member states when they were allied with the Soviet Union. However, some of these states, particularly the Czech Republic and Hungary, have emerged as Israel's closest allies in Europe.

Representation 
The EU maintains a representative office in Ramallah, accredited to the PNA. The PLO's general delegation in Brussels, accredited to the EU, was first established as an information and liaison bureau in September 1976. Other representations are maintained in almost every European capital, many of which have been accorded full diplomatic status. The EU's special envoy to the Middle East Peace Process is Sven Koopmans.

In western Europe, Spain was the first country granting diplomatic status to a PLO representative, followed later by Portugal, Austria, France, Italy and Greece.

Position on Israeli issues 
The EU has insisted that it will not recognise any changes to the 1967 borders other than those agreed between the parties. Israel's settlement program has therefore led to some tensions, and EU states consider these settlements illegal under international law.

In 2008, during the French presidency of the Council, the European Union strived to increase cooperation with the US on Middle-Eastern issues, inter alia with a view to coordinating common pressures on Israel.

The EU has also been highly critical of Israeli military actions in the Palestinian territories and Lebanon, often referring to them as "disproportionate" and "excessive force" and calling for an immediate cease-fire. During Operation Defensive Shield, the European Parliament passed a non-binding resolution calling for economic sanctions on Israel and an arms embargo on both parties. Following the Gaza War, the European Parliament endorsed the Goldstone Report. The EU has also been critical of Israel's Gaza blockade, referring to it as "collective punishment".

Position on recognition 

EU first endorsed the idea of Palestinian statehood in its 1999 Berlin Declaration. Before that, the EU and its predecessor, the EC, had since 1973 through various declarations legitimized Palestinian rights in the form of recognizing the Palestinians as "a people", the need for them to have "homeland" and exercising their "right to self-determination".

In July 2009, EU foreign policy chief Javier Solana called for the United Nations to recognise the Palestinian state by a set deadline even if a settlement had not been reached: "The mediator has to set the timetable. If the parties are not able to stick to it, then a solution backed by the international community should ... be put on the table. After a fixed deadline, a UN Security Council resolution ... would accept the Palestinian state as a full member of the UN, and set a calendar for implementation."

In December, the Council of the European Union endorsed a set of conclusions on the Israeli–Palestinian conflict which forms the basis of present EU policy. It reasserted the objective of a two-state solution, and stressed that the union "will not recognise any changes to the pre-1967 borders including with regard to Jerusalem, other than those agreed by the parties." It recalled that the EU "has never recognised the annexation of East Jerusalem" and that the State of Palestine must have its capital in Jerusalem. 

A year later, in December 2010, the Council reiterated these conclusions and announced its readiness, when appropriate, to recognise a Palestinian state, but encouraged a return to negotiations. Eight of its 27 member states have recognised the State of Palestine.

In 2011, the Palestinian government called on the EU to recognise the State of Palestine in a United Nations resolution scheduled for 20 September. Mahmoud Abbas reiterated such calls in Brussels again in early 2018. EU member states grew divided over the issue. Some, including Spain, France and the United Kingdom, stated that they might recognise if talks did not progress, while others, including Germany and Italy, refused. Catherine Ashton said that the EU position would depend on the wording of the proposal. At the end of August, Israel's defence minister Ehud Barak told Ashton that Israel was seeking to influence the wording: "It is very important that all the players come up with a text that will emphasise the quick return to negotiations, without an effort to impose pre-conditions on the sides."

EU member states were divided in their vote on United Nations General Assembly resolution 67/19 in 2012, which recognized Palestine as a non-member observer state at the UN General Assembly. 14 member states voted for, 13 abstained and the Czech Republic voted against.

In 2014, the European Union and the United States officially criticised Israel's settlement policies in East Jerusalem, which the Palestinians regard as their de jure capital, and warned against the further construction of Israeli homes on disputed land.

In December 2014, the European Parliament voted in favour of a non-binding resolution calling for the recognition of Palestinian statehood as part of a two-state solution and alongside the development of the peace process with 498 votes in favour, 88 against and 111 abstentions. In recent years, many European parliaments including France, Portugal, Spain, Italy, Greece, Luxembourg, Ireland and the United Kingdom have passed motions calling on their governments to recognize Palestine.

On 9 December 2019, new EU foreign policy chief Josep Borrell said ministers "will deeply discuss the situation in the Middle East" when they meet again in Brussels on 20 January 2020. Ireland and Luxembourg are among a small group of countries that want the issue put on the agenda; in a letter to Borrell, Luxembourg Foreign Minister Jean Asselborn said that hopes for a two-state solution are "being dismantled piece by piece, day after day," and that it is time to consider recognizing Palestine as a state.

EU Palestine support 
The Palestinian news agency Maan reported in 2011, citing a senior official at the Palestinian Ministry of Planning, that the PA has received about US$20 billion in donor funds since the peace process began. It is estimated that the EU, including individual contributions by its members, has given €10 billion to the Palestinians since the peace process began in 1994. Economic assistance to the PA and the Palestinian people constitutes the EU’s highest per capita foreign aid program.
The current framework for EU engagement with Palestine is the "2017-2020 – Towards a democratic and accountable Palestinian State" which includes annual meetings to assess progress.

See also
Council for European Palestinian Relations
Arab League–European Union relations
Israel–European Union relations

References

Further reading

Persson, Anders (2015). The EU and the Israeli-Palestinian Conflict, 1971-2013: In Pursuit of a Just Peace. Lanham: Lexington Books. 
Persson, Anders (2015). ”Sweden's Recognition of Palestine: A Possible Snowball Effect?”, Palestine - Israel Journal of Politics, Economics, and Culture, Vol, 20, No. 2/3, pp: 35-41.

External links

  The Office of the European Union Representative (West Bank and Gaza Strip, UNRWA)

 
Europe
Third-country relations of the European Union
1975 establishments in Europe